Peter Bentley, Sr. (1805 – September 26, 1875) was the fifth mayor of Jersey City in New Jersey. He succeeded Thomas A. Alexander. He served a single one-year term from April 1843 to April 1844. He was succeeded by Phineas C. Dummer.

Biography
Born on a farm in Halfmoon, New York, he moved to Jersey City, New Jersey in 1825 and became a lawyer in 1834. After his term as mayor, he left politics. He later organized the Mechanics' and Traders' Bank (currently the First National Bank of Jersey City) and became its President. In addition, he was Vice-President of the Savings Bank of Jersey City, Treasurer and later Director of the Gas Company and Treasurer of the Jersey City and Bergen Plank Road Company. He died in Jersey City on September 26, 1875 and was buried in the Old Bergen Church cemetery in Jersey City.

References

External links

1805 births
1875 deaths
People from Halfmoon, New York
Mayors of Jersey City, New Jersey
19th-century American politicians